Sri. B. Syed Mohammed Yasin joined the Indian Police Service in the year 1986. Before that he has worked as Professor in English. He hails from the State of Andhra Pradesh. His grandfather was a Police officer and father was a Judicial Officer in Andhra Pradesh Judiciary . He can speak English, Hindi, Urdu, Kannada, Telugu and Malayalam and he can understand Tamil.

Education
He studied MA English Literature from Sree Krishnadevaraya University Anantapur, Anadhra Pradesh. He studied BA Economics, Political science and Philosophy from Government Degree College Anantapur, Andhra Pradesh. He is a professional Orator in English, Hindi and Telugu, and he has won nearly 100 certificates in various competitions including debates, essay writing and The B P Singal medal for the Best English speaker for the 1986 Batch at The sardar Vallabhai Patel National Police Academy.

Career

ASP Trainging in Palakkad, Sub divisions Kannur, Kanjhagad, Additional Charge of Thalassery, Thaliparamba sub divisions . District SP Malapuram, Waynad, Kozhikode rural, And Commissioner of Police Kochi city. Held charge of 6 Police Ranges which is Kannur range Thrice, Ernakulam range Twice, and Thrissur range once. Held charge of IG Intelligence  Kerala  twice, brief charge as DIG VACB also worked as DIG Battalions, Commandant of KAP II, Palakkad and MSP Malappuram and Assistant Inspector General of Police I in PHQ and also worked as the Director Kerala Police Academy, Thrissur. Also Held charge of 3 Corporations which are KSCC Ernakulam, KPHCC Trivandrum, and KPBS Thrikkakara. Held the charge of DGP & Director Coastal Security Kerala, at Kochi. Also worked as DGP Intelligence Kerala  at Trivandrum. Held charge of DGP CRIMES at PHQ. Now working as DGP and Director, Vigilance and Anti Corruption bureau Trivandrum. Has vast experience of working in the law and order and Intelligence wing of Kerala Police for nearly 2 decades.

Medals and recognition
Awarded the Indian President's Police Medal for Meritorious Service for his outstanding Performance in the year – 2004, 
Awarded the Indian President's Police Medal for Distinguished Service

Awarded the Indian President's Police Medal for Distinguished Service RD - 2016.

Won the best English Orator award in the Sardar Vallabhai Patel National Police Academy (SVPNPA), Hyderabad.

References

 
 President's Police Medal for Distinguished Service - RD 2016(38.47 KB)
 http://www.thehindu.com/todays-paper/tp-national/tp-kerala/dewan-yasin-among-those-who-bag-presidents-medal/article8153852.ece  The Hindu Paper, Thriruvananthapuram, 26 January 2016
 https://dtf.in/wp-content/files/Indian_Police_Service_IPS_-_Civil_List_2014.htm
 http://thehinduimages.com/details-page.php?id=131048123&highlights=INSPECTOR%20GENERAL%20OF%20POLICE The HIndu Thriruvananthapuram, 15 February 2012
 https://web.archive.org/web/20160305001758/http://www.manoramaonline.com/news/announcements/dgps.html

1959 births
Living people
Indian police officers
Kerala Police officers
People from Kurnool district